The 2002 Carroll Fighting Saints football team was an American football team that represented Carroll College as a member of the Frontier Conference during the 2002 NAIA football season. In their fourth season under head coach Mike Van Diest, the Saints compiled a 12–2 record (7–1 against conference opponents) and won the NAIA national championship, defeating , 28–7, in the NAIA National Championship Game. It was the first of six national championships between 2002 and 2010.

The team played its home games at Nelson Field at Helena, Montana.

Schedule

References

Carroll
Carroll Fighting Saints football seasons
NAIA Football National Champions
Carroll Fighting Saints football
College football undefeated seasons